St Hugh's School is a preparatory school near Faringdon in Oxfordshire. The school is co-educational, day and boarding, offering both weekly and flexi-boarding, and has 350 pupils aged 3 to 13 years.

St Hugh's was established at Morland House in Chislehurst in Kent, South East London in 1906 before moving to Lamas House (which became a hospital during WW1) and then Widmore Court in nearby Bickley. During World War II the students and staff were evacuated to Malvern Wells in Worcestershire. During the school's absence from London, their buildings became the temporary wartime offices of Hodder & Stoughton. However, these were destroyed by a V-1 "Doodlebug" in the early morning of 27 June 1944. The school did not, therefore, return to London after the war but relocated to Carswell Manor, Oxfordshire, a Jacobean country house with grounds.

The school bears the name of Hugh of Avalon, Bishop of Lincoln from 1181 to 1200. It is a member of the Independent Association of Preparatory Schools and is administered as a charitable educational trust by a board of governors. For many years St Hugh's was solely a boys' full boarding school but since 1977 it has been co-educational.

Notable alumni
Henry Chadwick theologian
William Jolly Duncan professor of aeronautics
Anthony Fabian producer and director
Paramasiva Prabhakar Kumaramangalam Chief of the Army Staff (India)
Prof Sir Martin Landray epidemiologist
Lorn Alastair "Johnnie" Stewart TV producer and creator of Top of the Pops
John Bryan Ward-Perkins historian and archaeologist
Alan Watts, Beat Generation philosopher
Giles Martin music producer

External links
St Hugh's School, Faringdon
Profile at the Good Schools Guide
ISI Inspection Reports
Ofsted Boarding Social Care Inspection Reports

Preparatory schools in Oxfordshire
1906 establishments in England
Educational institutions established in 1906